Cracosna is a genus of flowering plants belonging to the family Gentianaceae.

Its native range is Indo-China.

Species:

Cracosna carinata 
Cracosna gracilis 
Cracosna xyridiformis

References

Gentianaceae
Gentianaceae genera